The 2017 DFB-Pokal Final decided the winner of the 2016–17 DFB-Pokal, the 74th season of the annual German football cup competition. The match was played on 27 May 2017 at the Olympiastadion in Berlin.

Eintracht Frankfurt, in their first final since 2006, faced Borussia Dortmund, the runners-up in the previous three finals. Borussia Dortmund won the match 2–1 to claim their fourth cup title.

As winners, Borussia Dortmund hosted the 2017 edition of the DFL-Supercup at the start of the next season, and faced the champions of the 2016–17 edition of the Bundesliga, Bayern Munich. The winners of the DFB-Pokal were also to earn automatic qualification for the group stage of the 2017–18 edition of the UEFA Europa League, but since Borussia Dortmund had already qualified for the 2017–18 edition of the UEFA Champions League through their position in the Bundesliga, the group stage spot went to the team in sixth, Hertha BSC, and the league's third qualifying round spot to the team in seventh, SC Freiburg.

Route to the final
The DFB-Pokal began with 64 teams in a single-elimination knockout cup competition. There were a total of five rounds leading up to the final. Teams were drawn against each other, and the winner after 90 minutes would advance. If still tied, 30 minutes of extra time was played. If the score was still level, a penalty shoot-out was used to determine the winner.

Note: In all results below, the score of the finalist is given first (H: home; A: away).

Pre-match

Officials
On 28 April 2017, the German Football Association announced that Deniz Aytekin would officiate the match, joined by his assistants Christian Dietz and Eduard Beitinger. Benjamin Brand was chosen as the fourth official. Aytekin has officiated on the DFB level since 2004, and in the Bundesliga since 2008. He is a FIFA listed referee since 2011, and is ranked as a UEFA Elite group referee.

Ticketing
With a stadium capacity of nearly 74,500, the two finalist teams received 21,000 tickets each. The remaining tickets available to the general public were available for sale via the DFB ticket portal from 2 to 16 March 2017 in four price categories: €130, €95, €70, and €45. A computer-generated draw determined the ticket allocation.

Seating
On 28 April 2017, the finalists met in Berlin with the DFB to set out the framework for the final. Eintracht Frankfurt were allocated the guest dressing room, with the Frankfurt fans in the Ostkurve of the stadium. The Alexanderplatz is connected to the Ostkurve for the "Fanfest". Borussia Dortmund got the home dressing room, and the Dortmund fans located at the Marathontor. The Breitscheidplatz is connected to the Marathontor for the "Fanfest".

Trophy
For the first time, the DFB, in partner with ERGO Group, hosted the "DFB-Pokal-Tour" of the competition trophy from 21 April to 4 May 2017. The trophy visited nine cities, with visitors getting to experience the history of the trophy. The tour also included the women's competition trophy on display while in Cologne, the venue for the women's final. Due to the positive response, the trophy also will make two additional stops in Berlin in the days before the final.

On 5 May 2017, Berlin mayor Michael Müller received the trophy at the traditional "Cup Handover" at the Wappensaal of the Rotes Rathaus in Berlin. The trophy will remain on display at the city hall until the final. DFB president Reinhard Grindel, DFB vice-president Peter Frymuth, and Berlin senator Andreas Geisel all attended the event. Hasan Salihamidžić symbolically gave the trophy to Grindel, on behalf of the current titleholders, Bayern Munich. The two finalists were represented at the event by Fredi Bobic and Alexander Meier for Eintracht Frankfurt, as well as CEO Hans-Joachim Watzke and Nuri Şahin for Borussia Dortmund.

At the "Cup Handover", the DFB announced that retired German figure skater and East German Olympic gold medalist Katarina Witt would be the trophy bearer for the final.

Kits
On 28 April 2017, Eintracht Frankfurt announced a special kit featuring the club's traditional colours would be worn for the final. The kit was unveiled on 8 May, featuring a white shirt with a black collar, a black stripe running along the top of the sleeve and upper back, and black sleeve cuffs. Eintracht Frankfurt's four previous cup-winning years are printed on the back of the collar. The kit also features black shorts and white socks in addition to the white kit.

On 18 May, Borussia Dortmund unveiled their new home kit for the 2017–18 season, which will also be worn during the DFB-Pokal final. The kit features a gradient hoop pattern on the front, with the back and sleeves monochrome. This will be accompanied by yellow shorts, and yellow and black socks.

Half-time performance
On 23 May, it was announced that German singer Helene Fischer would perform a specially made melody during the half-time interval of the DFB-Pokal final.

Related events
On 24 and 25 May, the finals of the 2016–17 Verbandspokal took place, determining the regional teams which will enter next season's edition of the DFB-Pokal. The 2017 DFB-Pokal der Frauen Final was held on 27 May at the RheinEnergieStadion in Cologne. The 2017 DFB-Junioren-Vereinspokal Final was also held on 27 May at the Stadion auf dem Wurfplatz in Berlin.

Match

Summary
Ousmane Dembélé opened the scoring for Borussia Dortmund in the 8th minute when he cut in past defender Jesús Vallejo on the right to fire left footed high into the net. Ante Rebić equalised in the 29th minute for Eintracht Frankfurt with a low shot to the right of the goalkeeper from ten yards out after receiving the ball out on the left from Mijat Gaćinović.

Borussia Dortmund were awarded a penalty in the 67th minute when goalkeeper Lukáš Hrádecký tripped Christian Pulisic. Pierre-Emerick Aubameyang scored from the penalty, chipping the ball to the center of the goal with his right foot.

Details

Statistics

See also

2017 DFL-Supercup
Football in Berlin

References

External links
 
 Match report at kicker.de 
 Match report at WorldFootball.net
 Match report at Fussballdaten.de 

2017
2016–17 in German football cups
Eintracht Frankfurt matches
Borussia Dortmund matches
Football competitions in Berlin
May 2017 sports events in Germany
2017 in Berlin